Ya Hui (born Koh Yah Hwee; 18 May 1987) is a Singaporean actress.

Early life
Ya Hui was born on 18 May 1987 in Singapore. She was educated at Manjusri Secondary School and Serangoon Junior College. She joined the Dance Team for her Co-Curricular Activities from her primary school days to junior college, and was the prom queen during her college days.

Career 
Ya Hui was offered a contract with Mediacorp after the Star Search contest, a large-scale TV talent scouting competition in Singapore, in 2007. She was considered a popular contestant for that contest season. She was one of the runners-up and the winner of the Miss Telegenic title at the grand finals. Shortly after, Ya Hui was chosen as the face for the TVC of beverages brand Heaven and Earth. She also landed a supporting role in the long-running drama series, Love Blossoms II as Tao Wen Zhu, acting alongside seasoned actors Ivy Lee and Zheng Geping. Her versatile acting skills and rising popularity earned her various roles in both English and Mandarin channel (Channel 8, U and 5) dramas such as Bountiful Blessings, Point of Entry, Served H.O.T (烧。卖) and Marry Me (我要嫁出去).

In 2009, Ya Hui starred in Reunion Dinner, in which she played Chen Liping's daughter. Her outstanding performance in the drama serials earned her nominations for the Newcomer Award of the Year in The New Paper Flame Awards 2008 and the Best Newcomer Award for Star Awards 2009. In September 2015, she completed filming the long-running 255-episode television drama series, 118, which aired weekdays on Mediacorp Channel 8. She was also appointed as the Singapore ambassador of the L'Oréal Paris Youth Code product in 2015.

Ya Hui has gotten 5 out of 10 Top 10 Most Popular Female Artistes from 2014, 2017–2019, 2021 respectively.

Personal life 

Ya Hui's official fan club is named "Team Yahui".

On 24 September 2015, Ya Hui was taken to the hospital after experiencing vomiting, possibly due to food poisoning.

As shown in her performance in "Ho Seh Bo", Ya Hui can speak Teochew and basic Cantonese.

Filmography

Television

Hosting

Film

Compilation albums

Accolades

References

External links
 
 

Living people
Singaporean people of Teochew descent
Singaporean film actresses
Singaporean television actresses
Singaporean television personalities
21st-century Singaporean actresses
1987 births